Aber bitte mit Sahne is an EP by the German thrash metal band Sodom. The title track is a cover of the 1975 song of the same name by Austrian singer Udo Jürgens. Its title translates into English as "But with whipped cream, please".

Track listing

Personnel
 Tom Angelripper – vocals, bass
 Andy Brings – guitars
 Atomic Steif  – drums

References

1993 EPs
Sodom (band) EPs